Blechnopsis is a small genus of ferns in the family Blechnaceae, subfamily Blechnoideae, according to the Pteridophyte Phylogeny Group classification of 2016 (PPG I). The genus is accepted in a 2016 classification of the family Blechnaceae, but other sources sink it into a very broadly defined Blechnum, equivalent to the whole of the PPG I subfamily.

Species
, using the PPG I classification system, the Checklist of Ferns and Lycophytes of the World accepted two species:
Blechnopsis finlaysoniana (Wall. ex Hook. & Grev.) C.Presl
Blechnopsis orientalis (L.) C.Presl

References

Blechnaceae
Fern genera